Wally Coates (4 January 1911 – 19 April 1990) was an  Australian rules footballer who played with Fitzroy and Essendon in the Victorian Football League (VFL).

Notes

External links 
		

1911 births
1990 deaths
Australian rules footballers from Victoria (Australia)
Fitzroy Football Club players
Essendon Football Club players